Kisvarsány is a village in Szabolcs-Szatmár-Bereg county, in the Northern Great Plain region of eastern Hungary.

Jews lived in Kisvarsány for many years until they were murdered in the Holocaust

Geography

External links
 The jewish community in Kisvarsány On JewishGen website.

References

Populated places in Szabolcs-Szatmár-Bereg County